Vaughan Williams J may refer to either of two British judges:

 Sir Edward Vaughan Williams (1797–1875)
 His son, Sir Roland Vaughan Williams (1838–1916)